The 15th Visual Effects Society Awards was held in Los Angeles on February 7, 2017, in honor to the best visual effects in film and television of 2016. The nominations were announced on January 10, 2017. The Jungle Book took five awards at the ceremony.

Winners and nominees
(winners in bold)

Honorary awards
Lifetime Achievement Award:
Ken Ralston
VES Visionary Award
Victoria Alonso

Film

Television

Other categories

Most nominations

Most wins

References

External links
 Visual Effects Society Awards 2016 at Internet Movie Database

2016
2016 film awards
2016 television awards